Merocrine (or eccrine) is a term used to classify exocrine glands and their secretions in the study of histology. A cell is classified as merocrine if the secretions of that cell are excreted via exocytosis from secretory cells into an epithelial-walled duct or ducts and then onto a bodily surface or into the lumen.

Merocrine is the most common manner of secretion. The gland releases its product and no part of the gland is lost or damaged (compare holocrine and apocrine).

The term eccrine is specifically used to designate merocrine secretions from sweat glands (eccrine sweat glands), although the term merocrine is often used interchangeably.

Examples 
 Salivary glands
 Pancreatic glands
 Certain sweat glands

References

External links 
 Diagram at uwa.edu.au

Exocrine system